Kenneth McKenzie Norrie FRSE is a Scottish legal scholar. He is professor of law at the Strathclyde Law School, where he was formerly head of department.  

He has previously taught at the University of Dundee.  

Professor Norrie is one of the foremost academics in Scots Family Law and Scots Law of Delict and was awarded lecturer of the year of 2007 by The Firm Magazine.

External links 
 University of Strathclyde Law School
 Firm Magazine

Year of birth missing (living people)
Living people
Scottish legal scholars
Academics of the University of Aberdeen
Academics of the University of Dundee
Academics of the University of Strathclyde
Fellows of the Royal Society of Edinburgh
Place of birth missing (living people)